Thomas Thompson "Tony" Whitson (1885–1945) was a South African professional footballer who played as a left back for Newcastle United between 1905 and 1919. He made 124 appearances in the Football League, and 146 across all competitions, representing them in the FA Cup Final in 1910 and 1911.

Honours
Newcastle United
First Division champions: 1908–09
FA Cup winner: 1910
FA Cup runner-up: 1911

References

1885 births
Sportspeople from Cape Town
1945 deaths
South African soccer players
Newcastle United F.C. players
Carlisle United F.C. players
English Football League players
English Football League representative players
Association football fullbacks
FA Cup Final players